Arsham Khondkaryan was an Armenian politician who served as Minister of Justice of the First Republic of Armenia.

References 

People of the First Republic of Armenia
Armenian Ministers of Justice